Ricco the Mean Machine (also known as The Cauldron of Death and The Dirty Mob) is a 1973 Italian-Spanish crime-thriller film directed  by Tulio Demicheli and starring Christopher Mitchum  and  Barbara Bouchet.  It became a cult film because of its violent and gory scenes, including a graphic castration. The US title was actually a misspelling of the main character's name Rico.

Plot

Cast

 Christopher Mitchum as Rico Aversi
 Barbara Bouchet as Scilla Calogero
 Malisa Longo as Rosa
 Arthur Kennedy as Don Vito
 Eduardo Fajardo as  Cirano
 Paola Senatore as  Conchetta Aversi
 Manolo Zarzo as Tony 
 José María Caffarel as  The Marseillese
 Ángel Álvarez as  Giuseppe Calogero
 Luis Induni as  Gaspare Aversi
 Victor Israel as Checana

References

External links

Italian crime thriller films
Spanish crime thriller films
1970s crime thriller films
Films directed by Tulio Demicheli
Films set in Turin
1970s Italian-language films
1970s Italian films